Aniyara is a 1978 Indian Malayalam film, directed by Bharathan and produced by M. O. Joseph. The film stars Kaviyoor Ponnamma, Sankaradi, Bahadoor and M. G. Soman in the lead roles. The film has musical score by G. Devarajan.

Cast
Kaviyoor Ponnamma 
Sankaradi 
Bahadoor 
M. G. Soman 
Mamatha
Muralimohan 
Reena 
Urmila

Soundtrack
The music was composed by G. Devarajan and the lyrics were written by P. Bhaskaran.

References

External links
 

1978 films
1970s Malayalam-language films